This article concerns the Germany national football team at the 2002 FIFA World Cup in South Korea and Japan.

Qualification 
Germany had to play against England, Finland, Albania and Greece, managed by fellow German Otto Rehhagel. It was to be an uneasy group, so much so as only the first placed team could qualify automatically.

The start was promising with four wins in a row, including a 1-0 win against England at Wembley. Since England could only manage a draw away at Finland, automatic qualification should have been a foregone conclusion. In the next game, there was a 2-2 draw against Finland, which was ironed out by winning away in Albania. In the following game, a draw against England would have seen Germany qualify automatically from this match.

After nine minutes, Germany took the lead with a goal by Carsten Jancker but England soon equalised with a Michael Owen goal. From that point on in the match, it seemed like England could do no wrong and what wrong was inconsequential for Germany to make up the point difference. Germany did not offer anything on the break and the final score was for England, 5-1. Automatic qualification was pushed back. 

The last match of qualifying saw Germany play Finland and simultaneously England play Greece. Germany was hoping for the Greeks to give them a helping hand, by at least drawing with England. Greece led until the 90th minute, when David Beckham equalised from a free kick. If Germany had won, then they would have finished first and with that qualified automatically to the World Cup finals. However, Germany only managed a 0-0 draw and therefore finished in second place.

That meant that Germany had to play a play-off game and drew Ukraine. On 10 November 2001, the two teams played out a 1-1 draw in Kyiv. Four days later, Germany finally qualified for the World Cup by winning 4-1. After only 15 minutes, Germany were leading the match 3-0.

The result of a England loss to Germany there followed by the latter being inundated by criticism, and they would not automatically qualify for a berth at the upcoming World Cup. Supporters of Germany said that the combative nature of the Germans makes them competitive. The convincing result against Ukraine was celebrated as a rebirth for German football.

Play-offs

Group 9 Final Table

Finals

Squad

Group stages 
At the draw for the "group stages", it was announced that Germany would be in Pot A, meaning they became joint favourites to win the tournament. The three-time world champions saw them meet Ireland, Cameroon and Saudi Arabia in the group stage.

Against Saudi Arabia, everything went according to plan, with Germany winning 8-0. Miroslav Klose scored a hat-trick against the Minnows. Carsten Jancker scored his first goal after enduring a dry run. It was Germany's highest win since the 1978 World Cup, where they beat Mexico 6-0. In the game against Ireland, Germany took an early lead, with Klose scoring once more but in added time Robbie Keane equalised for Ireland. That meant that if Germany could either beat or draw with Cameroon in their last group game, would see Germany qualify for the second round. At half-time in the game against Cameroon, the score was 0-0, but Germany had Carsten Ramelow sent off for a second yellow card offence. It did not look good for Germany, who were under pressure from Cameroon right from the start of the second hand. Substitute Marco Bode then opened the scoring for Germany, assisted by a wonderful pass from Klose and made the score 1-0. Bode's goal was voted goal of the month for June 2002 by the viewers of Sportschau. Cameroon, trained by fellow German Winfried Schäfer, also had a man sent off midway through the second half. From this moment, Germany took control and Klose made it 2-0 shortly after. Germany finished the group top.

Matches

Final Group E Table

Knock-out Rounds

References

 
Countries at the 2002 FIFA World Cup
2002